Qasemabad (also Romanized as Qāsemābād) is a village in Seyyed Jamal ol Din Rural District, in the Central District of Asadabad County, Hamadan Province, Iran. At the 2006 census, its population was 17, in 4 families.

References 

Populated places in Asadabad County